The Spook's Apprentice (American title: The Last Apprentice: Revenge of the Witch), written by Joseph Delaney, is the first story in The Wardstone Chronicles arc of the Spook's series. The plot centres on a 13-year-old farm boy named Tom who lives in the countryside of the county, loosely based on the English county of Lancashire, where the author resides with his large family. As Tom is the seventh son of a seventh son, he is able to see things others cannot, such as boggarts, ghasts, ghosts and others.

Plot
Tom Ward has lived his whole life in the County (loosely based on the English county of Lancashire). Because he is the seventh son of a seventh son and thus has the ability to see ghosts and fight other supernatural beings, his parents have apprenticed him to the Spook, a cloaked man named John Gregory (because only seventh sons of seventh sons have the aforementioned abilities, all spooks are seventh sons of seventh sons). Tom's mother, referred to as Mam, sent a letter to the Spook shortly after Tom's birth alerting him to his status as a seventh son of a seventh and promising that Tom would be "the best apprentice [the Spook will ever have, who will] also be [his] last." The Spook travels the County fighting troublesome creatures such as boggarts, ghosts, ghasts, and witches for the people who need these things gone. Tom will have to learn how the Spook fights "the Dark", so that he may one day become a Spook as well.

The Spook tells Tom that most of his other apprentices have failed due to their being cowardly, disobedient, or unluckily killed. It is revealed that one of the deceased was Billy Bradley, who had his finger bitten off and died from loss of blood while fighting a particularly dangerous boggart. Tom goes to live in the Spook's house in Chipenden. This house is protected from unwanted visitors by a boggart, with whom the Spook has made a contract. The contract states that as long as the roof is standing, the boggart must guard the home and kill intruders (as well as cook and clean for the Spook and his apprentices). It kills any visitors not invited in by the Spook (such as his apprentices), and as such potential clients wait outside and alert the Spook via a bell system. The boggart is promised in return the blood of creatures in the home after dark, as well as any hostile creatures of the dark. 

Tom is sent out on an errand to pick up some food for the house (as the boggart kills guests, provisions are supplied by having someone go to the town grocer). He is given a strict warning by the Spook: do not talk to women wearing pointy shoes, something characteristic of witches, whom spooks oppose. On his way home, some boys about the same age as Tom threaten to beat him unless he gives them some food. Tom refuses and the boys are about to beat him when suddenly a girl in pointy shoes shows up and scares them away by telling them a certain person is back. The mysterious girl's name is Alice Deane, and she is a relative of some of the most dangerous witches in the county: Mother Malkin and Bony Lizzie. The two are powerful witches in Pendle, a town conducive to the use of dark magic, and members of the Malkin clan, one of three Pendle witch clans along with the Deanes and Mouldheels (Alice's father was supposedly a Deane and her mother was Bony Lizzie, so her last name remains Deane despite her Malkin allegiance/membership). 

Alice tricks Tom into giving cakes, which he does not know contain blood, to Mother Malkin, a powerful witch Gregory has imprisoned in his garden. The blood empowers Malkin to escape, fulfilling in part Lizzie's plan, which also calls for Gregory's killing. Lizzie, a bone witch, works with her supposed niece and reluctant witchcraft student Alice, whom she abuses, and Tusk, a large and powerful abhuman (the offspring of a union between a human witch and the devil, referred to in the series as the Fiend). 

Dissatisfied with the cruelty of her relatives and fellow Pendle witches, Alice tentatively aligns herself with Tom, whom she befriends. However, Gregory remains distrustful of the young witch and his principles keep him in steadfast opposition to the use of dark magic, in which Alice still participates. This conflict over Alice leads to tension between Tom and Gregory in future installments. 

Gregory kills Tusk in battle by stabbing him through the forehead. Tom manages to "kill" Malkin at one point through a combination of his rowan wood staff, the staff's silver-alloy blade, and a furious river. Rowan wood, silver, and running water are all extremely dangerous to witches. However, as an extremely powerful witch, Malkin is able to live on as a dead witch, oozing into people's heads to control them. The Spook advises Tom that a witch can only be truly killed and sent to the Dark (an afterlife for creatures of the Dark and malicious humans roughly analogous to Hell) in one of two ways: either one must eat the witch's heart, or one must burn the witch's body. 

The book ends as the undead Malkin chases Tom back to his family's farm. He greatly weakens her with salt and iron, greatly effective against witches and other creatures of the Dark, and she flees into a pig pen. Malkin is then wholly eaten by pigs and thus goes to the Dark. Ward is firmly positioned as Gregory's apprentice, with Alice as an ally tolerated by the Spook.

Characters 
 Thomas Ward, apprentice to John Gregory and a seventh son of a seventh son.
 John Gregory, the main spook for the County who mentors Thomas. He previously was a priest. He is also a seventh of the seventh son.
 Alice Deane, a young witch who befriends Tom.
 Bony Lizzie, a malevolent witch and Alice's ex-teacher and her aunt. She uses Bone Magic
 Mother Malkin, Bony Lizzie's aunt and a malevolent witch who was bound in a pit by the Spook.
 Tusk, the monstrous abhuman son of Mother Malkin. 
 Mam, Tom's mysterious mother who seems to be able to look into the future.
 John Ward, Tom's father, a farmer, and a former sailor. 
 Jack Ward, Tom's oldest brother, who inherited the farm except for one room meant for Tom.
 James Ward, Tom's second oldest brother, a blacksmith by trade.
 Ellie Ward, Jack's wife.
 Mary Ward, the young daughter of Ellie and Jack.
 Father Gregory, the Spook's brother. They haven't spoken with each other in over forty years.

Film adaptation

The book was very loosely adapted into a 2014 film titled Seventh Son released in 3-D and IMAX 3D. Whilst most of the characters remain, their story has been much changed and expanded (presumably to better suit an older audience & the film's more 'epic' stature.) – It stars Ben Barnes, Jeff Bridges and Julianne Moore. Kit Harington and Alicia Vikander were cast as Tom Ward and Alice but in June 2011 Variety revealed that  Ben Barnes was cast as Tom Ward.

Drama script
In 2014, Stephen Delaney, Joseph Delaney's son, adapted The Spook's Apprentice into a 160-page play script; it is published under the title The Spook's Apprentice - Play Edition.

Other books in The Wardstone Chronicles

Related books 
 The Spook's Tale / Interception Point - This short story was combined with Mark Walden's Interception Point as part of a small (128 pages) special publication for World Book Day UK 2009 which could be purchased at that event for a £1 coupon. (2009)
 The Last Apprentice: The Spook's Tale And Other Horrors - A collection of four short stories [The Spook's Tale; Alice's Tale; Grimalkin's Tale; A Gallery of Villains]; this is a U.S.-released compilation incorporating the earlier published The Spook's Tale. (2009)
 The Spook's Stories: Witches - A collection of four short stories [Meg Skelton; Dirty Dora; Alice And The Brain Guzzler; The Banshee Witch]. Published in the U.S. as The Last Apprentice - A Coven of Witches. (2009)
 The Spook's Bestiary - A guidebook to the creatures found in The Wardstone Chronicles universe. Published in the U.S. as The Last Apprentice - The Spook's Bestiary: The Guide to Creatures of the Dark. (2010)
 The Ghost Prison - The book occupies the same world as The Wardstone Chronicles, but with different characters and story lines. (2013)
 The Last Apprentice: The Seventh Apprentice - A novella featuring the Spook's seventh apprentice, a boy named Will Johnson) (2015)
 The Spook's Stories Witches (2015)
 The Spook's Special Edition (2015)

Additional information
Paperback: = Published: 30 June 2005 Red Fox     
Hardback:= Published: 1 July 2004 Bodley Head

References

External links
Random House Page
Official site of the book
Official site of the series

2004 British novels
British children's novels
Children's historical novels
Novels set in Lancashire
The Bodley Head books
British novels adapted into films
2004 children's books
Children's fantasy novels
Ghosts in written fiction
Witchcraft in written fiction